Gregory F. Quinn is an American attorney and Republican member of the St. Louis County Council.  He has represented the seventh district since 1991.

Early life and career 
Greg Quinn received his bachelor's degree in economics from Michigan State University in 1972.  He went on to receive his J.D. degree from Washington University School of Law in 1975.  While in law school he was editor of the Urban Law Annual.  He has been admitted to the Missouri bar and Illinois bar.  He is currently a partner at Quinn & Banton, L.L.P., formerly Quinn, Ground, & Banton, where he has worked since 1976, when he co-founded the firm with law school classmate Paul Ground.  Another partner at the firm, Steve Banton, is a president of the Rockwood school board and state representative. Quinn's areas of practice are workers' compensation, personal injury, probation and estate planning, employment law, and business transactions.  He is married to Micki Quinn and has three kids.  He attends the St Clare of Assisi Church in Ballwin.

Political career 
Greg Quinn has been a member of the St. Louis County Council since 1991.  He has served two terms as council chairman.  He represents the seventh district, which contains about 145,000 people in west St. Louis County.

Committee assignments
Committee of the Whole
Committee on Disabilities
Revenue and Personnel

Electoral history

See also
St. Louis County, Missouri
St. Louis County Council

References

External links 
 . St. Louis County Missouri. Retrieved May 30, 2016.

Washington University School of Law alumni
Michigan State University alumni
Year of birth missing (living people)
Living people
Politicians from St. Louis County, Missouri
Missouri Republicans
County commissioners in Missouri
Lawyers from St. Louis